Ariomattidae is a family of marine ray-finned fishes which are classified within the suborder Stromateoidei of the order Scombriformes.

Genera
Ariommatidae contains one extant genus and one known extinct genus:

 means extinct

References

Stromateoidei
Ray-finned fish families